Live at the Famous Spiegeltent is the debut album from Melbourne singer and songwriter, Harry James Angus, and was released at concerts around Australia throughout 2008 and 2009. It was recorded on 24 and 25 October, at The Famous Spiegeltent in Melbourne. It was recorded and mixed by Sam Lowe and Andy Hunt of Salt Studios. Track 8, "Yakini (The Last Gorilla)", also appears on The Conglomerate's second album, Hold Your Breath - Harry is also a member of this band. On both the 24th and 25th, recordings of the entire show were released 15 minutes after the show had finished. This album is a combination of both recordings (mainly the 25th/Saturday night recording as the Friday night show was plagued with technical difficulties).

Track listing
"Daddy's Millions" – 3:27
"Introduction" – 3:23
"Matty and Josie" – 5:27
"Boring Life" – 4:46
"The Batsman" – 3:45
"Bring The Rain" – 6:09
"Breakup Song" – 3:07
"Yakini (The Last Gorilla)" – 3:24
"The Banker" – 3:14
"Suburbia" – 3:29
"Underground" – 5:34
"Summer of '96" - 4:32

2008 live albums
Harry James Angus albums